Petersfield Museum and Art Gallery is a local museum in the small town of Petersfield in Hampshire, England. Petersfield Museum Limited is a registered charity.

Location
The museum is now located in the Old Police Station on St Peter's Road, Petersfield and encompasses the former 'justice site' including the Old Magistrates Courthouse, police stables and cart house.

History
The museum was formed by a group of local historians, 'The Petersfield Area Historical Society'. Over the years, objects and archive material were collected, later formally transferred to the museum, and now form the extensive collections. The museum has been open since 1999 and holds materials that relates to the town of Petersfield and the surrounding villages. It began moving to Petersfield's old police station in 2016.

Between 2017 and 2021 the museum underwent a £4 Million rebuild.

Collections
The museum holds photographs, archives, oral history and maps relating to the town and surrounding area. A timeline feature takes the visitor through the history of the town alongside some temporary cases which  change over annually.

Justice
Part of the former police station next door was added to the museum in 2016 to display a Victorian justice heritage exhibit.

Bedales Historic Dress Collection
In 2007, the Bedales Historic Costume Collection was donated to the museum. This collection is made up of about 1000 pieces including ladies, gents and children's clothing and accessories dating from 1720.

The Flora Twort Collection
Flora Twort was an English artist who specialised in watercolours and pastels of the scenes and people of Petersfield. Her paintings were exhibited at the Royal Academy. She died in 1985 leaving her cottage, studio and examples of her work to Hampshire County Council. It was run as a museum and restaurant by HCC until 2008. In 2009, the Flora Twort Gallery and its collections were transferred to the Petersfield Museum Trust. This collection consists off paintings, sketches and archives relating to her life. It includes vibrant, vivacious paintings of Petersfield Market and the Taro Fair of the 1920s and 1930s.

Edward Thomas 
Edward Thomas, the renowned poet, writer, essayist and literary critic lived locally to Petersfield in the village of Steep. It was from here he first started writing his poetry in December 1914 at the age of 36 and over the next two-and a-half -years wrote all his 144 poems. Inspired by the landscapes around him, much of his poetry reflected his love of nature and the impact the War was having on life in England. Two of his greatest friends were the English poet and writer Gordon Bottomley and the American poet Robert Frost. Edward Thomas's most well known poem is probably Adlestrop. Although being over-age he enlisted into the Artists Rifles in July 1915, transferred to the Royal Garrison Artillery in October 1916  and was killed on active service at the first Battle of Arras on 9 April 1917. Petersfield Museum, together with the Edward Thomas Fellowship, has created the only Edward Thomas Study Centre in England, which is under-pinned by what is possibly the most important private collection of books by and about Edward Thomas in the country. This collection was the property of the late Tim Wilton-Steer and donated to the Edward Thomas Fellowship by his family.

The Don Eades Collection 
In 2016, Don Eades - a photographer from Buriton - gave his life's work to Petersfield Museum and Art Gallery. The collection pulls daily life from the 1960s, 1970s and 1980s into focus, from Petersfield's first supermarket to village sports, cycling proficiency and a futuristic factory.

The Social History Collection 
The social history collection illustrates the social, economic and cultural history of Petersfield and the surrounding villages. The object collection includes locally made products such as Minibrix from the local Itshide rubber factory, signs from local pubs and shops as well as tools and objects used in the home. Among the highlights are a penny farthing made on the Isle of Wight and the Coat of Arms from the former magistrates court.

References

External links
 Petersfield Museum and the Flora Twort Gallery
 Entry in the 24 Hour Museum

Museums established in 1999
Petersfield
History of Hampshire
Museums in Hampshire
Local museums in Hampshire
1999 establishments in England
Art museums and galleries in Hampshire
Biographical museums in Hampshire